Pseudotelphusa palliderosacella is a moth of the family Gelechiidae. It is found in North America, where it has been recorded from Alabama, Illinois, Kentucky, Maine, Maryland, Ohio, Oklahoma, Texas and West Virginia.

The forewings are pale greyish, dusted with dark grey, and very faintly tinted with roseate. The base of the costal margin, an oblique fascia behind it, and a little farther back, but still before the middle, an oblique costal band, extending to the fold, are all blackish-brown. Behind the last of these streaks, in the middle of the wing, is a short, blackish dash surrounded by a hoary or whitish annulus. Behind the middle is a costal, dark grey spot, opposite to which is a still smaller dorsal one, and opposite to the space between them is another blackish dash, the portions of the wing above and below which are but little dusted, while behind it the apical part of the wing is more densely dusted with brownish scales.

References

Moths described in 1878
Pseudotelphusa